Ray Douglas Hurt is an American agricultural historian, academic and author. He is a professor of history at Purdue University.

Hurt is known for his research on the Great Plains, Civil War, Native Americans, technology, and the American South, West, and Midwest, as well as the Green Revolution. His work places the economic and political aspects of agricultural history in an environmental and social context. Hurt is the author of numerous books including ’’The Ohio Frontier: Crucible of the Old Northwest, 1720-1830’’, ’'The Great Plains during World War II’’, The Big Empty:  The Great Plains in the Twentieth Century, Agriculture and the Confederacy:  Policy, Productivity, and Power in the Civil War South, Food, Agriculture during the Civil War, and The Green Revolution: Science, Politics, and Unintended Consequences, among others.

Hurt has served as the president of Agricultural History Society and as a Big XII Faculty Fellow. Hurt has also served on award committees for Ohio Valley History and the Indiana Historical Society. Hurt has served as the editor of the Missouri Historical Review, Ohio History, Agricultural History, and The Henry A. Wallace Series on Agricultural History and Rural Life.

Education
Hurt studied at Fort Hays State University and received his bachelor's degree and master's degree in 1969 and 1971, respectively. He then earned his doctoral degree from Kansas State University in 1975.  He has been a Smithsonian Postdoctoral-Fellow in the History of Science and Technology, 1976–1977.

Career
Following his postdoctoral fellowship, Hurt held the position of a visiting assistant professor at Texas Tech University, 1977–1978.  He then held concurrent appointments as a curator of agricultural history at the Ohio Historical Society and as an adjunct associate professor of history at the Ohio State University. From 1986 till 1989, he was the associate director of the State Historical Society of Missouri. He then joined Iowa State University as an associate professor in 1989 and was promoted to professor in 1992. In 2003, Hurt left Iowa State University to become professor and head of the department of history at Purdue University. He remained head of the department until 2018.

Research
Hurt's research is focused on the Great Plains, Civil War, Native Americans, technology, and the American South, West, and Midwest, along with the Green Revolution. He has worked on placing the economic and political aspects of agricultural history in an environmental and social context. He also published a paper on the various possibilities and pitfalls regarding the museum studies for historians.

Agricultural history of America
Hurt's work on the agricultural and rural history of America resulted in a book titled American Agriculture: A Brief History which focused on the major economic, technological and scientific developments regarding American agriculture from the colonial period. Hurt also has analyzed various contributions and studies conducted on American agricultural history and reviewed the discipline of American agricultural history in scholarly publications.

Agriculture and Slavery in Missouri's Little Dixie
In 1992, Hurt published his book titled, Agriculture and Slavery in Missouri's Little Dixie, for which he received the Theodore Saloutos Award by the Agricultural History Society, and the Missouri History Book Award by the State Historical Society of Missouri. The book was reviewed as “a welcome addition to the literature”. According to D. Clayton Brown, “students of agricultural history and antebellum history should know this book”.

This  book has been  reviewed as “a solidly researched, informed account that fills a vacant niche in the historical literature”. In a review, David E. Schob stated that the book “may well be the best volume published in agricultural history in 1992”.

The Ohio Frontier: Crucible of the Old Northwest, 1720-1830
Hurt published his book The Ohio Frontier: Crucible of the Old Northwest, 1720–1830 in 1996. The book gathered numerous reviews including a review by E. J. Fabyan, stating that “finally, after nearly twenty-five years, a high quality general history of the frontier period of the state of Ohio is now available”. The book is “a dynamic account of the Ohio frontier that should delight both trans-Appalachian frontier scholars and interested amateurs”. In another review, the book was stated as “extremely readable and exciting treatments of the region during the eighteenth and nineteenth centuries”. Kay J. Karr noted that “readers who are looking for such a straightforward, no-nonsense approach will appreciate his (Hurt's) clarity.”

The Great Plains during World War II
Hurt's book, ‘’The Great Plains during World War II’’ received the Kansas City Star Noteworthy Book Award and the Choice Outstanding Academic Title in 2008. The book is reviewed as “a thorough analysis of the period from the war's beginning to its conclusion”. According to Greg Hall, “his best chapters are those that distinguish the Great Plains experience from that of the rest of the country”. Michael W. Schuyler reviewed that “This is an outstanding book that will be of interest not only to professional historians but also to general readers with an interest in the history and development of the Great Plains”, and stated that “This is history at its best—both scholarly and fascinating reading—and is indispensable for our understanding of the Great Plains experience during the Second World War”.

Agriculture and the Confederacy: Policy, Productivity, and Power in the Civil War South
In 2015, Hurt published Agriculture and the Confederacy: Policy, Productivity, and Power in the Civil War South. According to David K. Thomson, Hurt's “focus on an environmental history of the war with a decided fusion with the history of capitalism” sets apart his work from other authors. Louis Ferleger stated the book as “Hurt's brilliant analysis” in which he “meticulously examines the pattern of southern agriculture and its impact on southern society”.

Hurt's book is also reviewed as “a well-reasoned narrative” and “the first comprehensive study of Confederate agriculture in fifty years”, along with “an impressive, and at times dizzying, assessment of all things Confederate agriculture”. In a review, Michael Todd Landis stated that “Agriculture and the Confederacy is truly a comprehensive book, and Hurt should be applauded for both the depth of his research and his easy narrative style”.

Bibliography

Selected books
The Dust Bowl:  An Agricultural and Social History (1981) 
Indian Agriculture in America: Prehistory to the Present (1988) 
Agriculture and Slavery in Missouri's Little Dixie (1992) 
The Ohio Frontier: Crucible of the Old Northwest, 1720–1830 (1996) 
Nathan Boone and the American Frontier (1998) 
The Indian Frontier, 1763–1846 (2002) 
American Agriculture:  A Brief History, rev. ed. (2002) 
The Great Plains during World War II (2008) 
The Big Empty:  The Great Plains in the Twentieth Century (2011) 
Agriculture and the Confederacy: Policy, Productivity, and Power in the Civil War South (Civil War America) (2015) 
Food and Agriculture during the Civil War (2016) 
Documents of the Dust Bowl: Eyewitness to History (2019) 
The Green Revolution in the Global South: Science, Politics, and Unintended Consequences (NEXUS) (2020)

Selected articles
Hurt, R. D. (2004). "Reflections on American Agricultural History."  Agricultural History Review, 1–19.
Hurt, R. D. (2004). "The Agricultural and Rural History of Kansas: Review Essay." Kansas History: A Journal of the Central Plains, 27, 194–217.
Hurt, R. D. (2008). "Agricultural Politics in the Twentieth-Century West," in The Political Culture of the New West, 51–73.
Hurt, R. D. (2013). "The Agricultural Power of the Midwest during the Civil War," in Union Heartland:  The Midwestern Home Front during the Civil War, 68–96.
Hurt, R. D. (2016). "Teaching Agricultural History at Land-Grant Universities," in Service as Mandate:  How American Land-Grant Universities Shaped the Modern World, 1920–2015, 314–30.

References 

Living people
1946 births
Historians of agriculture
Purdue University faculty
Fort Hays State University alumni
Kansas State University alumni